Drapetodes mitaria is a moth in the family Drepanidae. It was described by Achille Guenée in 1857. It is found in Hong Kong and from India to Singapore and in Taiwan.

Adults are on wing in June and July.

The larvae feed on Hedychium species.

References

Moths described in 1857
Drepaninae